Kongor (also Romanized as Kangar) is a village in Kongor Rural District, in the Central District of Kalaleh County, Golestan Province, Iran. At the 2006 census, its population was 1,464, in 339 families.

References 

Populated places in Kalaleh County